John Jensen (13 May 1937 – 6 September 2012) was a Danish footballer. He played in four matches for the Denmark national football team from 1957 to 1958. He was also named in Denmark's squad for the qualification tournament for the 1958 FIFA World Cup.

References

External links
 

1937 births
2012 deaths
Danish men's footballers
Denmark international footballers
Association football forwards
Footballers from Aarhus
Aarhus Gymnastikforening players
Danish 1st Division players